Inside Mr Enderby is the first volume of the Enderby series, a quartet of comic novels by the British author Anthony Burgess.

The book was first published in 1963 in London by William Heinemann under the pseudonym Joseph Kell. The series began with the publication in 1963 of Inside Mr. Enderby, continued in 1968 with Enderby Outside and 1974 with The Clockwork Testament, or Enderby's End, and concluded after a ten-year break in 1984 with Enderby's Dark Lady, or No End to Enderby. Some of the poems included in the novel were later published in the Revolutionary Sonnets and Other Poems collection.

Plot summary
The story opens on a note of pure fantasy, showing school children from the future taking a field trip through time to see the dyspeptic poet Francis Xavier Enderby while he is asleep. Enderby, a lapsed Catholic in his mid-40s, lives alone in Brighton as a 'professional' poet - his income being interest from investments left to him by his stepmother.

Enderby composes his poetry whilst seated on the toilet. His bathtub, which serves as a filing cabinet, is almost full of the mingled paper and food scraps that represent his efforts. Although he is recognised as a minor poet with several published works (and is even awarded a small prize, the 'Goodby Gold Medal', which he refuses), he has yet to be anthologised.

He is persuaded to leave his lonely but poetically fruitful bachelor life by the editor of a woman's magazine, Vesta Bainbridge, after he accidentally sends her a love poem instead of a complaint about a recipe in her magazine. The marriage, which soon ends, costs Enderby dearly, alienating him from his muse and depriving him of his financial independence.

Months pass, and Enderby is able to write only one more poem. After spending what remains of his capital, he attempts suicide with an overdose of aspirin, experiencing disgusting (and rather funny) visions of his stepmother as he nears death.  His cries of horror bring help, and he regains consciousness in a mental institution, where the doctors persuade him to renounce his old, "immature" poetry-writing self.  Rechristened "Piggy Hogg", he looks forward contentedly to a new career as a bartender.

Criticism
 
Anthony Burgess wrote a review of Joseph Kell's book for the Yorkshire Post. "[W]hen the editor sent him the author's novel—Burgess thought it was a practical joke but it wasn't."
When the paper found out that Kell was one of Burgess' pen names, Burgess was removed from his reviewing duties.

Anatole Broyard of The New York Times wrote:
"Mr. Burgess is so fond of Enderby—by far his best creation—that he has devoted four books to him: Inside Mr. Enderby and Enderby Outside, which were published in 1968, The Clockwork Testament in 1975, and now, Enderby's Dark Lady."

Harold Bloom has nominated the novel as one of his candidates for "the most undervalued English novel of our era".

Reviews

Release details
1963, UK, William Heinemann (ISBN B0000CLQ13), Pub Date ? ? 1970, Hardback
1984, US, Mcgraw-Hill, Pub Date April ? 1984, Hardback
1984, US, Mcgraw-Hill, Pub Date ? ? 1984, Paperback
1996, US, Carroll & Graf Publishers, Pub Date January ? 1996, Hardback (complete Enderby series)

Footnotes

Sources, references, external links, quotations
 
NY Times Book review of the last book in the series
Biography

Novels by Anthony Burgess
1963 British novels
British comedy novels
Works published under a pseudonym
Novels set in Brighton
Heinemann (publisher) books